Ocaña may refer to:

People 
 Aguas Santas Ocaña Navarro (born 1963), Spanish-born first lady of Honduras
 Álvaro Ocaña (born 1993), Spanish footballer
 Ángel Ocaña (born 1960), Spanish professional racing cyclist
 Christian Ocaña (born 1992), Mexican footballer
 Graciela Ocaña (born 1960), Argentine politician
 :es:José Pérez Ocaña (194783), Spanish painter, anarchist and LGBT activist
 Luis Ocaña (194594), Spanish road bicycle racer
 Manuel Ortega Ocaña (born 1981), Spanish professional road cyclist
 Octavio Ocaña (born 1982), Mexican actor

Places 
 Mesa de Ocaña, a comarca in Castilla-La Mancha, Spain, in the province of Toledo
Ocaña, Norte de Santander, a city in Colombia 
 Convention of Ocaña, 1828
Ocaña, Spain, a town in the province of Toledo, Spain
 Battle of Ocaña (1809), during the Peninsular War
 Roman Catholic Diocese of Ocaña

See also 
Ocana, Corse-du-Sud, a commune of France in the Corse-du-Sud department on the island of Corsica
 Ocana, an Intermittent Portrait, a 1978 Spanish documentary film about José Pérez Ocaña
 Peribáñez y el Comendador de Ocaña, a play by Lope de Vega written in the late 16th or early 17th century
 

Surnames of Spanish origin